Cornelia Tesch is a former competitive figure skater who represented West Germany. She is the 1982 World Junior silver medalist, a two-time Nebelhorn Trophy champion (1981, 1985), and a two-time German national silver medalist (1984 and 1986). Tesch competed at two European Championships — achieving her best result, tenth, in 1984 — and at the 1984 World Championships. She was coached by Karel Fajfr.

Competitive highlights

References 

German female single skaters
Living people
Sportspeople from Stuttgart
World Junior Figure Skating Championships medalists
Year of birth missing (living people)